Potters Bar war memorial is located in St John's Churchyard in High Street, Potters Bar, England. The memorial was designed by the Arts and Crafts architect and designer C.F.A. Voysey and originally stood at the junction of Hatfield Road and The Causeway. It has been Grade II listed on the National Heritage List for England since it was moved to its present location in December 1973. Voysey's only other free standing war memorial, the Malvern Wells War Memorial, was erected in 1920 in Malvern Wells in Worcestershire.

The memorial is on the site of the former St. John's Church which was replaced by St. Mary's Church, The Walk, in 1915 after St. John's became dilapidated.

References

External links

http://www.geograph.org.uk/snippet/8592
http://www.hertsatwar.co.uk/potters_bar
http://www.hertsburialsandmemorials.org.uk/search.html
https://www.warmemorialsonline.org.uk/node/121592

1920 establishments in England
Buildings and structures completed in 1920
Monuments and memorials in Hertfordshire
Buildings by C.F.A. Voysey
Grade II listed buildings in Hertfordshire
Grade II listed monuments and memorials
Potters Bar
Outdoor sculptures in England
Stone sculptures in the United Kingdom
World War I memorials in England
World War II memorials in England